Rooikat may refer to:

 The Caracal, a medium-sized wild cat
 The Rooikat, an armoured fighting vehicle built in South Africa